Zosteraceae (one of the four seagrasses families, Kubitzki ed. 1998) is a family of marine perennial flowering plants found in temperate and subtropical coastal waters, with the highest diversity located around Korea and Japan.  Most seagrasses complete their entire life cycle under water, having filamentous pollen especially adapted to dispersion in an aquatic environment and ribbon-like leaves that lack stomata. Seagrasses are herbaceous and have prominent creeping rhizomes. A distinctive characteristic of the family is the presence of characteristic retinacules, which are present in all species except members of Zostera subgenus Zostera.

Zosteraceae has long been accepted by taxonomists as monophyletic. The APG II system of 2003 recognizes this family and places it in the monocot order Alismatales. The family contains approximately twenty-two species divided between two genera, Phyllospadix and Zostera totalling 22 known species (Christenhusz & Byng 2016 ). Zostera contains three subgenera: Heterozostera (formerly considered a separate genus ), Zostera and Zosterella. Zosteraceae is closely related to Potamogetonaceae, a family of freshwater aquatics.

Zosteraceae is a conserved name.

Taxonomy

Marine grasses families: Zosteraceae, Cymodoceaceae, Ruppiaceae and Posidoniaceae. Related families: Potamogetonaceae and sometimes including Zannichelliaceae.

References

Further reading

Waycott, M, McMahon, K, Lavery, P 2014, A Guide to Southern Temperate Seagrasses, CSIRO Publishing, Melbourne,

External links

 Zosteraceae in L. Watson and M.J. Dallwitz (1992 onwards).
 The families of flowering plants: descriptions, illustrations, identification, information retrieval. Version: 27 April 2006.
 Zosteraceae in the Flora of North America
 NCBI Taxonomy Browser
 links at CSDL, Texas

 
Alismatales families